Schistura pseudofasciolata is a species of stone loach, a freshwater fish in the family Nemacheilidae. It has only been recorded from its type locality which is the Canyu River, part of the Yangtze River drainage in Huidong County in Sichuan, China.

References

P
Freshwater fish of China
Endemic fauna of Sichuan
Fish described in 1993
Taxa named by Zhou Wei (zoologist)
Taxa named by Cui Gui-Hua